Hibbertia hypericoides, commonly known as yellow buttercups, is a species of flowering plant in the family Dilleniaceae and is endemic to the south-west of Western Australia. It is usually a spreading shrub with linear to elliptic or egg-shaped leaves, and yellow flowers, usually with ten to fifteen stamens arranged in a cluster on one side of the two densely hairy carpels.

Description 
The upper surface is mostly g;abrous, the edges of the leaves are turned down or rolled under and the lower surface in densely covered with white hairs. There are usually ten to fifteen stamens arranged in a single cluster on one side of the two carpels as well as seven to twenty staminodes in bundles. The carpels are densely hairy and each has two ovules.

Taxonomy 
This species was first formally described in 1817 by Augustin Pyramus de Candolle who gave it the name Pleurandra hypericoides in the his book Regni Vegetabilis Systema Naturale. In 1863, George Bentham changed the name to Hibbertia hypericoides in Flora Australiensis. The specific epithet (hypericoides) means "Hypericum-like".

In 1995, Kevin Thiele and Geoff Cockerton described two subspecies in the journal Nuytsia and the names are accepted by the Australian Plant Census:
 Hibbertia hypericoides (DC.) Benth. subsp. hypericoides has glossy, dark green leaves with the edges rolled under;
 Hibbertia hypericoides subsp. septentrionalis K.R.Thiele & Cockerton has dull, greyish-green leaves with more or less flat edges.

Distribution and habitat 
Subspecies hypericoides grows in a wide variety of habitats including woodland and shrubland and is widely distributed from Dongara to Augusta and inland as far as Wongan Hills. Subspecies septentrionalis typically grows in kwongan and Banksia woodland and is found in two disjunct populations - one between Kalbarri and Dongara and the other inland from the Arrowsmith River.

Conservation status
Both subspecies of H. hypericoides are listed as "not threatened" by the Government of Western Australia Department of Parks and Wildlife.

See also 
 List of Hibbertia species

References

hypericoides
Eudicots of Western Australia
Plants described in 1863
Taxa named by Augustin Pyramus de Candolle